Lidia Trettel (born 5 April 1973 in Cavalese) is an Italian snowboarder and Olympic medalist. She received a bronze medal at the 2002 Winter Olympics in Salt Lake City.

References

1973 births
Living people
People from Cavalese
Italian female snowboarders
Olympic snowboarders of Italy
Snowboarders at the 1998 Winter Olympics
Snowboarders at the 2002 Winter Olympics
Olympic bronze medalists for Italy
Olympic medalists in snowboarding
Medalists at the 2002 Winter Olympics
Sportspeople from Trentino